Santa Isabel may refer to:

People
 Elizabeth of Portugal
 Isabelle of France (saint)

Places

Argentina
 Santa Isabel, Buenos Aires, a settlement in General Alvear Partido 
 Santa Isabel, Córdoba, a neighbourhood in the city of Córdoba
 Santa Isabel, La Pampa, in the province of La Pampa

Brazil
 Santa Isabel, Espírito Santo, a town in the state of Espírito Santo
 Santa Isabel, Goiás, a town in the state of Goiás 
 Santa Isabel, São Paulo, a town in the state of São Paulo 
 Santa Isabel do Rio Negro, in the state of Amazonas
 Vila Santa Isabel, a neighborhood in Carrão (district of São Paulo)

Cape Verde
 Santa Isabel (Boa Vista), a parish on the island of Boa Vista

Colombia
 Santa Isabel (Bogotá), a barrio (neighborhood) in Bogotá
 Santa Isabel, Tolima, a town in Tolima department
 Santa Isabel (TransMilenio), a station on Bogotá's TransMilenio mass-transit system
 Santa Isabel (volcano), a volcano

Cuba
 Santa Isabel de las Lajas, historical and cultural name of the city of Lajas, Cuba

Equatorial Guinea
 Former name of Malabo, the country's capital 
 Former name of Pico Basilé, highest mountain in Equatorial Guinea

Mexico
 Santa Isabel, Baja California, a city in the state of Baja California
 Santa Isabel, Chihuahua, a city in the state of Chihuahua
 Santa Isabel Municipality, also in Chihuahua
 Santa Isabel Cholula, in the state of Puebla

Panama
Santa Isabel, Colón, a corregimiento (district subdivision) in Santa Isabel District

Philippines
 Santa Isabel, San Pablo, a barangay (administrative district) of San Pablo, Laguna Province

Portugal
 Santa Isabel (Lisbon), a former parish, extant from 1741–2012

Solomon Islands
 Santa Isabel Island, an island in the South Pacific

United States
 Santa Isabel de Utinahica, a former Spanish mission in the state of Georgia

Puerto Rico
 Santa Isabel, Puerto Rico, a municipality located on the southern coast

Venezuela
 Santa Isabel, Trujillo, the shire town of municipality Andrés Bello in Trujillo (state)

Other
Santa Isabel languages, spoken in the Solomon Islands
Santa Isabel Theater, in Recife, Brazil
Santa Isabel (supermarkets) of Chile
Santa Isabel (church) in Lisbon, Portugal
, a number of ships with this name